The Epanterii or Epanterii Montani were a small Ligurian tribe dwelling in the lower Alps, near the Mediterranean coast, during the Iron Age.

Name 

They are only mentioned once as Epanterii Montani by Livy (late 1st c. BC).

The name Epanterii appears to be of Indo-European origin. It can be interpreted as deriving from a stem *ep-ant-, that is, 'belonging to the horse' or 'provided with horses'.

Geography 
The Epanterii dwelled in the lower Alps, near the Mediterranean coast. The exact location of their territory remains uncertain. It was possibly situated in the upper Tanarus valley, north of the Intimilii and Ingauni, and east of the Ecdinii and Vesubiani.

History 
By the 3rd century BC, the prosperity of thriving Ligurian coastal centres led to recurrent conflicts with mountainous tribes conducting raids on their richer neighbours. During the Second Punic War (218–201 BC), the Carthaginian Mago Barca made an alliance in 205 BC with the coastal Ingauni to secure a foothold on the Italian shore. He helped them in their fight against the Epanterii, who lived above them on the hills and raided their territory, eventually taking Epanterian prisoners of war to Carthage.

References

Primary sources

Bibliography 

 
 

Ligures
Tribes conquered by Rome